Kimberly Dark (August 12, 1968) is an American author, professor of sociology, and storyteller.

Life
Dark was born in San Diego, California in 1968. She received a B.A. from University of Colorado, Colorado Springs in 1989, and an M.A. in Sociology from Cal State San Marcos in 1998. She began her work as a storyteller and performance artist in 1998. She was previously founder and principal for Current Change Consulting, a firm specializing in coalition building facilitation, conflict resolution, and qualitative research.

Her current work uses sociological perspectives and first person storytelling to discuss ways humans organize social life – through gender, race, class, and sexuality (among others). Her trainings, lectures and writings use humor to reveal the makeup of privilege and oppression, as the purpose is to prompt change. Her work has been produced at colleges and universities in North America and Europe, and at theaters, festivals, conferences and other events worldwide.

She offers regular trainings on Unlearning Unconscious Bias, Becoming a Brilliant Bystander, and Linguistic Reframing. She expands upon these trainings in her 5-day Body Wise Professional Development Intensives in Hawaii. Her educational programs and interactive lectures include "Gender Race and Money" and "You Don't Owe Anyone Pretty." Kimberly Dark also teaches in a graduate program in Sociological Practice at Cal State San Marcos.

As of 2021, she has authored and toured nine solo-performances including, You Don't Owe Anyone Pretty, Things I Learned from Fat People on the Plane, Complicated Courtesies, Love Sex and Laughter, The Butch Femme Chronicles: Discussions With Women Who Are Not Like Me (and Some Who Are), Public Contact, True Confessions of a Lesbian Diva, Stripped and Teased: Scandalous Stories With Subversive Subplots, and Dykeotomy.

Work

According to Dr. Lynda Dickson, University of Colorado, "There is clear evidence that [Dark] has constructed a social context for her narratives. The characters not only have a personal story – a lived experience – but the stories are routinely connected to a larger, social reality... Attending one of her performances could accomplish more than a semester course of introduction to sociology." As a form of pop-sociology, Dark's writings are also well-received as entertainment. Strong poetic imagery blend with moving stage presence (Munro, 2008). In October 2010, Campus Pride, an American non-profit organization which promotes and supports LGBTQ leaders on University campuses, named Kimberly Dark on the "Top 25 'Best of the Best' LGBT speakers, performers [who] raise awareness of inclusion, visibility on college campuses nationally." The first Tuesday of every month, she offers The Hope Desk, a free social justice online help desk, on different audience-suggested topics.

Her first book of poetry, Love and Errors, was released on May 22, 2018. Love and Errors is a book of narrative poetry that uses both personal and fictional accounts to explore themes of love, gender roles, violence, and survival. Jimmy Santiago Baca says of Love and Errors: "I've always loved Kimberly's work, loved the strength and beauty of her renditions, loved the insights and grace of the arrangement of her words, compiling verse line upon verse line to capture the secrets of our dreams and deepest instincts. Radical, lovely..." Sonja Renee Taylor writes, "In this collection, Kimberly Dark combs the mossy undersides of girl and womanhood and exhumes what is most verdant and fertile in us. Her work illuminates the hard to see places, the shadow sides we most fear exposing because Kimberly knows all good growth begins in the soil of us. These poems reminded me of the possibilities in my own rich earth." Love and Errors also received positive reviews from Lambda Literary and the San Diego City Beat.

Her novel The Daddies will be released on October 21, 2018. The Daddies uses a combination of hybrid narrative, magical realism, and pop-culture analysis to expound the role of patriarchy and "Daddy" in culture, told as a lesbian leather-Daddy love story. Lidia Yuknavitch says of The Daddies: "No one anywhere writes all the way through eros, power exchange, and sexuality more fiercely than Kimberly Dark. In The Daddies, Kimberly risks what most writers will not, opening up and asking how masculinity has woven through every realm of our existence, how it has seduced us, betrayed us, protected us, violated us, how it lives in men and women and every other gender and sexuality, how we are facing a reckoning. Kimberly Dark asks us to embrace and reimagine masculinity from the inside out and hold the embrace long enough to change the world." Hanne Blank describes The Daddies as a "hypersaturated, unrelenting Willy Wonka boat ride through a pulsating circulatory system of patriarchy, pain, and desire."

Her collection of essays Fat, Pretty, and Soon to Be Old explores appearance hierarchy and provides a blueprint for how each of us can build a more just social world, one interaction at a time. Includes an afterword by Health at Every Size expert, Lindo Bacon. Lucy Aphramor writes, "The conversational tone that draws us in camouflages the robust intellectual work that frames the stories. Linking the personal and political with theoretical integrity and without recourse to academic devices for legitimacy, the book serves as  an exemplar of a liberatory teaching style. If you’re looking for a moving read that is also an important contribution to fat activism this is it." Terese Mailhot describes these essays as "Sexy and often fearless and real... beautiful and powerful work. Kimberly Dark is hilarious and heart breaking."

Her next collection of essays, Damaged, Like Me will be released on June 29, 2021 that aim to build roads to a more equitable and loving collective culture of body sovereignty, racial justice, and gender liberation. Ariel Gore writes, “Kimberly Dark has forever transformed the way I understand sex, gender, and the notion of ‘damage.’ The patriarchy should be terrified of this book. The rest of us can stick it in our hearts—emboldenment for the revolution.” Lidia Yuknavitch says, "Each dazzling essay asks what we might learn from the tensions, contradictions, erasures and difficulties we have inhabited at the edges of culture, and how we may yet reinvent ourselves and new communities. These brilliant insights will illuminate new paths even through the troubled dark."

Themes and style

Frequent themes include gender, sexuality, race, class, and appearance hierarchy. Driving all of her work is the belief that "we are creating the world even as it creates us," and the belief that we can all reclaim our power as social creators. Her texts and trainings are concerned with both politics and pedagogy – the way feminist theory and critical theory are brought to non-academic audiences through storytelling and performance. Academically, Dark's approaches are situated in research methods such as autoethnography and poetic inquiry. As sociologist Laurel Richardson articulates, "I consider writing as a method of inquiry, a way of finding out about a topic...form and content are inseparable" (2000, p. 923).

Publications

 "Examining Praise from the Audience: What does it mean to be a 'successful' poet-researcher." (Poetic Inquiry 2009)
 "Parting, Renewal" and "Famous Poet" (San Diego Poetry Annual 2009)
 "My Son is a Straight A Student"  (Poetic Inquiry: Vibrant Voices in the Social Sciences 2009)
 "Roadside, Perris CA" (Visible: A Femmethology 2008)
"Ways of Being in Teaching" (Sense Publishers 2017)
"Love and Errors" (May 22, 2018)
"The Daddies" (October 21, 2018)
"Fat, Pretty, and Soon to Be Old" (September 24, 2019)
"Damaged, Like Me" (June 29, 2021)

Discography

 You Are My Singing Lesson, Eko Records, 2002
 Location Is Everything, Durga Sound Studio, 2008

Performances

 The Butch Femme Chronicles: Discussions With Women Who Are Not Like Me (and Some Who Are) (1998)
 Public Contact (1999)
 True Confessions of a Lesbian Diva (2000)
 Stripped and Teased: Scandalous Stories With Subversive Subplots (2005)
 Dykeotomy (2009)
Things I Learned from Fat People on the Plane (2017)

Lectures and Educational Programs

 Gender, Race and Money (2003)
 Is that a Dude? Inside Lesbian Gender, It's More Complex than You Think (2004)
 Becoming the Subject of Your Own Story (Rather Than The Object Of Another's Gaze) (2007)

See also
 LGBT
 Women's Studies
 Feminism
 Autoethnography
 Performance Art
 Fresh Fruit Festival

Notes

References
 Munro, David. Kimberly Dark and Alix Olson, Fresno Bee, July 29, 2008
 Juno, Stephanie. Dark Sheds Light on Identity Issues in Butch Femme Chronicles, Gay and Lesbian Times, December 11, 1997
 Smith, Kristin. "Lesbian Theater" Curve, December 2006
 Smith Kristin. "Lesbian Theater" Curve, December 2009
 Poetic Inquiry: Vibrant Voices in the Social Sciences eds. Leggo C, Prendergast M, Sameshima M, Sense Publishing: Rotterdam 2009
 San Diego Poetry Annual 2008 ed. Hardy, W.H. Authorhouse, 2009
 Visible: A Femmethology ed. Burke J, Homofactus Press 2008

External links
 Official website

1968 births
Artists from San Diego
Feminist studies scholars
Lesbian feminists
American lesbian writers
Living people
Writers from San Diego
21st-century American women writers